Peter Burke Hildreth (8 July 1928 – 25 February 2011) was a British hurdling athlete.

Athletics career
Born in Bedford, he reached the semi-finals of the 110 metre hurdles at the 1952 Olympic Games in Helsinki, finishing 12th. He also represented Britain at the 1956 Melbourne Olympics and the 1960 Rome Games. He won the bronze medal in the 1950 European Championships in spite of a poor lane draw on a wet track.

He equalled the British record for the 110 metre hurdles, with a time of 14.3 seconds, on five occasions.

Hildreth won the 110m (then 120 yards) hurdles event in 14.5 sec. at the AAA championships in the White City on 14 July 1956. He finished the final race only 0.1 sec. ahead of Ion Opris, the Romanian champion, who created a major stir by running straight off the track and out of the stadium to claim political asylum in Britain.

He represented England in the 120 yards hurdles at the 1958 British Empire and Commonwealth Games in Cardiff, Wales.

Personal life
He was the son of Wilfred Hildreth, who represented British India at the 1924 Summer Olympics in athletics. His education was in St Paul’s School, Darjeeling. Following his retirement from athletics, he served as an athletics journalist, writing for the Sunday Telegraph and commentating on events for BBC Radio.

Hildreth, in July 2008, at age 80, was banned from running up an escalator in the Elphicks Farnham department store on safety grounds.

Hildreth died on 25 February 2011 at the age of 82.

References

External links
 
 Interview from Highgate Harriers
 

1928 births
2011 deaths
Sportspeople from Bedford
British male hurdlers
Olympic male hurdlers
Olympic athletes of Great Britain
Athletes (track and field) at the 1952 Summer Olympics
Athletes (track and field) at the 1956 Summer Olympics
Athletes (track and field) at the 1960 Summer Olympics
Commonwealth Games competitors for England
Athletes (track and field) at the 1958 British Empire and Commonwealth Games
European Athletics Championships medalists
Japan Championships in Athletics winners
People educated at Ratcliffe College
British people of Anglo-Indian descent
St. Paul's School, Darjeeling alumni